Crooked River is a river that flows from headwaters in the Southern Alps to Lake Brunner in the West Coast region of New Zealand's South Island.  It is named for the erratic path it takes.  Near Lake Brunner, it passes through reasonably flat farmland, but closer to its source, it rushes through gorges and rapids.  One tributary is the Poerua River from Lake Poerua.

Fishers visit Crooked River to catch trout. The river is also used by canoeists.  Recently, there has been a minor silt build-up in the river's middle reaches.

There are two backcountry huts available for trampers along the Crooked River.

References

Grey District
Rivers of the West Coast, New Zealand
Rivers of New Zealand